Samantha Roberts (born 21 April 2000) is an Antiguan swimmer. She competed in the women's 50 metre freestyle event at the 2016 Summer Olympics, where she ranked 57th with a time of 27.95 seconds. She did not advance to the semifinals. She was the youngest member of Antigua and Barbuda's 2016 Olympic team.

She competed in the women's 50 metre freestyle event at the 2020 Summer Olympics.

References

External links

2000 births
Living people
Antigua and Barbuda female swimmers
Olympic swimmers of Antigua and Barbuda
Swimmers at the 2016 Summer Olympics
Pan American Games competitors for Antigua and Barbuda
Swimmers at the 2015 Pan American Games
Swimmers at the 2018 Summer Youth Olympics
Antigua and Barbuda female freestyle swimmers
Swimmers at the 2020 Summer Olympics
Sportspeople from Memphis, Tennessee